Day Dreams is a lost 1919 silent film directed by Clarence Badger and starring Madge Kennedy and John Bowers. It was produced and distributed by Goldwyn Pictures.

Cast
Madge Kennedy - Primrose
John Bowers - Dan O'Hara
Jere Austin - George Graham
Alec B. Francis - Grandfather Burn
Grace Henderson - Grandmother Burn
Marcia Harris - The Housekeeper 
Rumpletilzen - A Duck

References

External links

1919 films
American silent feature films
Lost American films
American black-and-white films
Films directed by Clarence G. Badger
Goldwyn Pictures films
American romantic comedy films
1919 romantic comedy films
1910s American films
Silent romantic comedy films
Silent American comedy films
1910s English-language films